Education in Slovakia consists of a free education system based on 10 years of compulsory school attendance.

General characteristics
Most schools, especially universities, are owned by the state, though since the 1990s there are also church-owned and private schools (see Statistics section).

Slovakia has 10 years of compulsory education.

Students go to school five days a week, from Monday until Friday. Saturdays as school days were cancelled before the 1980s. Summer break is from the 1st of July until the end of August (at universities also in June). Other breaks occur a week around Christmas and Easter, in spring, and on official holidays.

A school year consists of two semesters. The first one ends at the end of January in all schools, the second one before the beginning of the summer holidays (see above). Primary and secondary school students usually have around 6 classes a day (less at the beginning of the education, more later). Classes last for 45 minutes, and there  (several short ones and one longer one – the so-called "big break" (or by the students often just "big one")). The state financed education and all textbooks and instructional material below the university level are free (returned at the end of the semester) – in most cases at least. However, there are also private schools which are paid.

Students at standard schools receive marks in almost all subjects. The marks go from 1 (best) to 5 (worst), and may include unofficial intermediary marks (such as to assess a single project, test, etc. but never on student's final reports). Compared to western European countries, there is an intrinsic "tradition" of teachers granting students rather more marks at the "good" end of the scale, i.e. more 1s, 2s and 3s than they would receive in western Europe, for example. Students below the university level receive school reports (lists of final marks) at the end of each semester.

History 
See: Education in Czechoslovakia and List of colleges and universities in Slovakia

System

Primary education

Primary schools are usually preceded by kindergartens where children can spend up to 4 years, which in turn can be preceded by day nurseries.

Generally, children start primary school in the year in which they reach 6 years of age. Standard primary schools last 9 years (8 before approx. the mid-1990s), however since the early 1990s students can visit an "8-year" gymnasium, where they can start attending after just 5 years (4 prior to the school year of 2009/2010) of primary school.

The primary education system is formally divided in two "stages". The second stage is characterized by many changes in the subjects treated as compared to the first stage:
first primary education stage- age 6 to 10, works as platform for next studies
second primary education stage- age 10 to 15, this "stage" can be spent either in a 9-year primary school or in an 8-year gymnasium.

Many primary schools have been closed down since about 2000 due to unfavourable demographic development.

Subjects at the second primary education stage (many of them are taught even earlier however) include:
Slovak language and literature (includes Slovak and world literature and Slovak grammar; Slovak is to be replaced with Hungarian or Ukrainian in minority schools; usually one class every day), 
foreign language(s) (usually two or one, usually English and German, French, Russian or Spanish; before 1990 Russian was compulsory with 4 classes a week) Usually 3-5 classes per week of the main language (usually English) and 2 classes per week of the other language,
mathematics (incl. geometry; one class every day),
geography (political and physical alike, usually 2 classes a week), 
biology (incl. botany, animal biology, human biology, geology and environmental studies; usually 2 classes a week), 
chemistry (usually 2 classes a week), 
physics (usually 2 classes a week), 
history (usually 2 classes a week), 
religion or ethics (students may choose between one or the other, usually 1 class a week),
physical education (usually 2 classes a week),
musical education (usually 1 class a week; sometimes skipped altogether due to lack of equipment, funds, teachers),
artistic education (usually 1 class a week, sometimes skipped altogether due to lack of equipment, funds, teachers),
technical education (usually 1 class a week, sometimes skipped altogether due to lack of equipment, funds, teachers)

There are also many facultative "primary art schools" — afternoon schools for particular music instruments, theatre, painting, etc. These have had a long tradition in Slovakia and are attended by a large portion of pupils.

Secondary education

Before entering any school of secondary education (including 8-year gymnasium) for which there are more applicants than places offered, the applicants have to pass entrance examinations.

Secondary schools usually last for 4 years (from the age of 16 to the age of 19). A gymnasium can also last up to 8 years (up to the age of 18) depending on how many years the student spent in primary school.

There are four types of secondary schools:
 general education (non-vocational):
gymnázium (i.e. gymnasium, also translated as grammar school or high school) – 4 or 8 years (rarely other lengths), i.e. age 16 to 19 or age 10 to 18; prepares students for higher education; teaches at least 2 foreign languages
 various vocational schools (visited by students interested in arts, crafts or any special skills):
stredná odborná škola(secondary professional school) – usually age 16 to 19; usually also prepares for higher education
stredné odborné učilište (secondary vocational school) – usually age 16 to 19; training center
združená stredná škola ('grouped' secondary school) – usually age 16 to 19; rare

The gymnasia (high schools) are usually considered "prestigious" schools, because they explicitly prepare for higher education and because they are often highly selective - only the brightest students from elementary schools may be accepted. In fact, most students who attend them later continue their education at a school of higher education in Slovakia or abroad. The high schools that are the most competitive are usually located either in Bratislava (Gamča, Gymnázium Metodova, Gymnázium Jura Hronca (GJH), ŠPMNDAG A school for the exceptionally talented children), in Košice (Gymnázium Poštová etc.), and a boarding gymnasium in the city of Sučany Bilingválne Gymnázium Milana Hodžu often abbreviated to GBAS - meaning Gymnasium Bilingual English-Slovak. Of the latter GBAS is considered the most prestigious in the central region, Poštová in the eastern region, and GJH as well as GAMČA in the western region where the capital, Bratislava, is located. These schools annually accept only a very low percentage of applicants often below 15% or 10%, and tend to accept a large proportion of commuting or boarding students subject to tradition. Despite providing general education, many gymnasia have specialized classes . Some of them specialize in languages or are even "bilingual" Slovak-German/English/French etc. (e.g. Gymnázium Milana Hodžu, Gymnázium Metodova, Gymnázium Jura Hronca), others are specialized in mathematics or computer programming, for example Gamča and Gymnázium Jura Hronca. Gamča is notable for being founded in 1626  which is exactly 113 years after the gymnasium in Levoča was founded in 1513. On the other hand, GBAS is noted for being established only in 1993 through a close cooperation of the Slovak Ministry of Education with the British Council of Slovakia holding the name of a respected Slovak statesman Milan Hodža. The 1st Slovak debate club was established at GBAS, and noted educationalists argue GJH and GBAS started a wave of sending the most talented students to the most selective of English. French and American high schools (such as Eton group, ESAO, UWC ...) as well as universities (including Harvard University, Oxford University, Cambridge University. Imperial College London, LSE. Science Po Paris campus, Princeton University, Bocconi University in Milan and others).

After finishing secondary school students usually take a school-leaving exam (matura in German, "maturita" in Slovak), which is a basic prerequisite for visiting a school of higher education (college), especially a university. Before 1990 this included obligatory exams in mathematics (written nationwide standardized + oral), Slovak incl. literature (written nationwide standardized + oral) and Russian and in one subject of the students's choice. After 1990, the system was changed, so that every school prepared its own tests and questions – at gymnasia in the subjects: Slovak incl. literature (written and oral), a foreign language (written and oral), two subjects of the student's choice (oral). The obvious problem of this system was low or missing comparability of the results. The maturita system was modified in 2005 again. The new system is supposed to replace the current entrance examinations to schools of higher education (colleges) in the future. The main changes are: one additional exam subject (for gymnasia), nationwide unified written tests for languages and mathematics (other subjects are supposed to follow in the future), a high degree of standardization of other exams, as well as the possibility for the student to choose whether they want to pass an A-level exam (the simplest one), a B-level exam or a C-level exam (the most difficult one, only for languages). At gymnasia, the exam subjects include: Slovak incl. literature (written and oral), a foreign language (written and oral), a natural science subject, and two other subjects of the student's choice [Details in Slovak:  ]

Higher education

The Slovak term "vysoká škola" ("school of higher education", literally "high school", compare the German name Hochschule), which for lack of other expressions is also translated into English as "college", can refer  to all schools of higher (i.e. tertiary) education, or in a narrower sense only to those schools of higher education that are not universities.

The first university on the territory of Slovakia was the Universitas Istropolitana (=Academia Istropolitana) founded in 1465. The main and largest current university in Slovakia is the Comenius University. For other current universities and colleges see List of colleges and universities in Slovakia.

The 2002 Act on Schools of Higher Education dinstinguishes public, state, and private schools of higher education (colleges):
Public schools of higher education are the basic case. They are established by law. The vast majority of schools of higher education is of this type. They are financed by the government and possible business activities. 
State institutions of higher education are all military, police and medical schools. They are established through the corresponding ministries of the government. They are financed by the government and possible business activities.
Private institutions of higher education are established and financed by non-government institutions, but approved by the Ministry of Education. This type of school is still quite rare.

Studies at the state and public universities is available free of charge for residents of Slovakia (?)and of the EU. School fees are being planned, however. Other students have to pay from US$2,500 to US$6,500 for one academic year.

Before entering any school of higher education for which there are more applicants than places offered, the applicants have to pass entrance examinations. These examinations take very different forms at particular schools. The "maturita" results of the applicant are usually also taken into account when evaluating whether he can become student of the school. Since the number of branches of study and of schools of higher education increased considerably in the course of the late 18th century (although at the cost of quality of the studies), the general percentage of those not being accepted to these schools decreased considerably over the same time period. Also, an increasing number of Slovaks studies abroad, especially in the Czech Republic due to a low language barrier, a slightly better economic situation (and job perspectives) in that country, as well as similarities of the two educational systems. As a result, the percentage of Slovaks with higher education has increased considerably over the last decade.

The studies are organized within the following study programmes and "stages" (also translated as levels). Each school must provide at least Stage 1:
Stage 1: Bachelor study programme; 3–4 years; title: "Bachelor"  (bakalár, abbr. "Bc.")
Stage 2, or  Stage 1 + Stage 2 (Stage 2 lasts 1–3 years):
Master's study programme; title: "Master" (magister, abbr. "Mgr.") [in art studies: Master of Arts (magister umenia, abbr. "Mgr. art.")];
 Engineer study programme; title: "Engineer" (inžinier, abbr. "Ing.") [in architecture "Engineer of Architecture" (inžinier architekt, abbr. "Ing. arch.")]
 Doctor study programme ; titles: 
a) in human medicine: "Doctor of Medicine" (doktor medicíny, abbr. "MUDr.")
b) in veterinary medicine: "Doctor of Veterinary Medicine" (doktor veterinárnej medicíny, abbr. "MVDr.")
c) in dental medicine: "Doctor of Denatal Medicine" (doktor zubného lekárstva, abbr. "MDDr."), studying since 2010
Stage 2/3: 
Doctor after writing a rigorous thesis and passing a viva voce and rigorous exam are:
a) in natural science "Doctor of Natural Sciences" (doktor prírodných vied, abbr. "RNDr."),
b) in pharmacy "Doctor of Pharmacy" (doktor farmácie, abbr. "PharmDr."),
c) in social sciences and art sciences  "Doctor of Philosophy" (doktor filozofie, abbr. "PhDr."),
d) in law studies "Doctor of Laws" (doktor práv, abbr. "JUDr."),
e) in teaching and PE studies  "Doctor of Pedagogy" (doktor pedagogiky, abbr. "PaedDr."),
f) in theology (except for Catholic theology) "Doctor of Theology" (doktor teológie, abbr. "ThDr.").
Stage 3: 
Doctor and study programme; 3–4 years; titles (placed behind the name):
a) basic title "Philosophiae Doctor" (doktor, abbr. "PhD.")
b) in art studies "Doctor Artis" (doktor umenia, abbr. "ArtD.")
c) in Catholic theology "Licentiate of Theology" (licenciát teológie, abbr."ThLic.") or "Doctor of Theology" (doktor teológie, abbr. "ThDr.")
specialisation studies in medicine

The Act on Schools of Higher Education 2002 dinstinguishes:
university-type schools of higher education: They provide study programmes at all three stages and with a considerable proportion of the 2nd and 3rd stage. Only these schools are allowed to use the word "university" in their name.
non-university-type schools of higher education = professional schools of higher education: These are the remaining schools (providing predominantly the first stage only)

The academic year begins on 1 September of the current year and ends on 31 August of the next year (in reality, however it ends in May/June). The studies in one academic year may be divided into two semesters or rarely in three trimesters. The teaching process includes various forms of instruction such as lectures, seminars, exercises, laboratory work, projects, practical training, consultations, etc. The credit system following the rules of the European Credit Transfer System (ECTS) has been introduced in 1998 for the organisation of all levels and forms of higher education study. The student's standard load is expressed by the number of sixty credits per academic year and thirty credits per semester. The school of higher education determines the total number of credits required for due completion of the study in its respective stages.

Students who live further away from their university may apply for a dorm, however private housing is increasingly popular among students despite its higher cost. Dormitories and schools provide a canteen with very low prices for students. All study materials must be obtained by students. Students receive a wide range of discounts and the state pays their health insurance and for social security payments. Students of both public and private universities can enjoy the listed benefits if they are younger than 26 year old and are student of a daily program. The current setup of universities in Slovakia makes it possible for even the poorest to attend if they can afford the first fees for application, the first payment for a dormitory, and the first purchase of study materials.

Universities offer external study program as an alternative to the daily program. The external study is longer by 1 year for both Bachelor's and Master's courses and students of external study aren't eligible for state benefits. The major difference between external study and a daily study program is the number of courses and the scheduling modified to favor employed people. The final exams for both daily and external program students are the same.

Among the most desired by employers are STEM degrees with primacy held by degrees in IT, preferably from Slovak University of Technology in Bratislava and engineering degrees. Other desirable degrees for employees are from economics, mostly from University of Economics in Bratislava.

Statistics

Schools and students (school year 2004/2005) 
Unless stated otherwise, the numbers give daily studies (i.e. non-external studies). The first number gives the number of schools, the number in brackets the number of students.

A) Kindergartens and primary education (excl. special schools) 
Kindergartens (materské školy) : 3000 (147317) state, 16 (598) private, 30 (1317)  church

Primary schools (základné školy):  2217 (530 770) state, 16 (1159) private, 109 (25392) church

Primary art schools (základné umelecké školy): 180 (92146), 34 (7934) private, 7 (2239) church

B) Secondary education (excl. special schools) 
''Note: Strictly speaking, this section also includes professional schools and vocational schools that are  post-secondary education."

Gymnasia/grammar schools/high schools (gymnáziá): 161 (84984) state, 22 (3362) private, 51 (14392) church, - (1634) external st. at these schools; out of which:
8-years gymnasium: - (32902) state, - (7531) private , - (1731) church, 
4-years gymnasium: - (48285) state, - (6693) private, - (1594) church , - (1634) external
5-years gymnasium (usually bilingual):- (424) state, - (168) private, - (37) church
6-years gymnasium: - (373) state

Secondary professional schools + professional schools (stredné odborné školy + odborné školy): 
"public": 191 (74258) state, 35 (3974) private, 6 (1223) church, - (1178) external st. at these schools, 4 (2778) external schools; comprise:
 in terms of school type: 81 industrial, 98 economic, 20 agricultural, 3 forestry, 1 librarian, 11 pedagogical, 10 conservatories, and 12 girls' professional schools; out of which:
 in terms of the type of studies: 
8-years schools: rare, conservatories only
"superstructure" studies (nadstavbové štúdium): rare, 1–3 years, agricultural and pedagogical
4-years school with a maturita: the rule
5-years school with a maturita: rare
"higher" studies (vyššie štúdium):  3 years /conservatories 6 years
"post-maturita" studies (pomaturitné štúdium): 1–3 years
1-3-years school without a maturita: rare, one pedagogical school only
professional schools of the Ministry of Health: 22 (6637) state, 8 (1441) church, - (2693) external st. at these schools
professional schools of other ministries: 3 (1014) state, 1 (715) external school

 "Grouped" secondary schools (združené stredné školy): 105 (62772) state, 3 (1310) private, 1 (656) church, - (1248) external st. at these schools; comprise:
"superstructure" studies (nadstavbové štúdium): 2 years
4-years school with a maturita
5-years school with a maturita
"higher" studies (vyššie štúdium):  3 years 
"post-maturita" studies (pomaturitné štúdium): 1–3 years
1-3-years school without a maturita 
specially adapted curricula (zvlášť upravené učebné plány, ZUUP): 1–3 years
gradual preparation (stupňovitá príprava): 1–3 years

Secondary vocational schools + vocational schools (stredné odborné učilištia + učilištia):202 (63886), 26 (8433), 5 (1206), - (3848) external st. at these schools; comprise:
"superstructure" studies (nadstavbové štúdium): 2 years
4-years school with a maturita
5-years school with a maturita
2-3-years school without a maturita
specially adapted curricula (zvlášť upravené učebné plány, ZUUP): 56-98 decades
gradual preparation (stupňovitá príprava): 1–3 years

C) Special schools (špeciálne školy) 
(incl. special kindergartens, primary schools, gymnasia etc.): 418 (32210) state, 5 (82) church, 12 (490) private

D) Schools of higher/tertiary education (vysoké školy) 
"public" and "private" schools of tertiary education: 20 (106194) state, 4 (828) private, - (53018) external st. at these schools
"state" schools of tertiary education: 3 (1280) schools of the ministries (Health, Police, Defence), - (1755) external st. at these schools

Other statistics
Graduates (tertiary education: calendar year 2004, otherwise: school year 2003/2004):
secondary education: 75988 non-external st., 3390 external st.
tertiary education: 19742 non-external st., 10166 external st.

Teachers 2004/2005:
kindergartens, primary and secondary education: 81403 internal, 6873 external
tertiary education: 10604 internal, 1965 external

Average monthly teachers' pay in 2004:
primary and secondary education: ca. 14750 SKK (ca. 380 EUR) [the number roughly equaled the general average pay in the Slovak economy at that time]
tertiary education (excl. private schools): ca. 23500 SKK (ca. 600 EUR)

Number of schools:
primary (excl. special):
1989:2302 
1999:2471
2004:2342
secondary (excl. special): 
1989:620
1999:949
2004:841
tertiary:
until 1991:13
1992-1996:14
1997-1999:18
2000-2002:23
2003:25
2004:27

Number of graduates from tertiary schools (including postgradual "doctor" degree):
1989: 10415
1993: 11090
1997: 15048
2001: 24120
2002: 25630
2003: 28272
2004: 30762

Language of all schools as of 2004 (incl. kindergartens):
Slovak: 5840 (including 19 "bilingual"[e.g. Slovak-English/Spanish/German etc.] gymnasia)
Hungarian:585 + 1 university
Slovak and Hungarian:194
Ukrainian: 34
Slovak and Ukrainian: 
Other: 5

References